

Champions

National Association of Base Ball Players: Atlantic of Brooklyn

Events
 March 19 - The first openly all-professional baseball club is formed as the Cincinnati Red Stockings. Major League Baseball considers this event to mark its foundation.
 May 4 - The Cincinnati Red Stockings debut as the sport's first openly all-professional team, defeating the Great Westerns 459.
 June 8 - An amateur club in Buffalo, New York called the Niagaras defeated another club called the Columbias 20910 in the highest-scoring baseball game ever.
 June 15–17 - As part of their Eastern tour the Red Stockings defeat the Mutual of New York, Atlantic of Brooklyn, and Eckford of Brooklyn clubs 42, 3210, and 345, respectively.
 July 3 - The Eckford of Brooklyn club defeats the defending champion Mutual of New York club for the second time this season by a score of 315. This puts the championship flag in the possession of the Eckfords under the current rules.
 August 16 - The Red Stockings win over the visiting Eckford club 4518 at their own Union Grounds.
 Late September/Early October - Travelling west over the newly completed First transcontinental railroad, the Red Stockings play several games in San Francisco, winning all by lopsided scores.
 October 12 - The Chicago Base-Ball Association is founded.  The association exists today as the Chicago Cubs.
 November 5 - The Red Stockings complete an undefeated season with their 60th victory in as many contests, defeating the visiting Mutual Green Stockings of New York 178 before 7,000 spectators.
 November 8 - For the second time since the Eckfords won the flag, they are defeated by the Atlantic of Brooklyn club. This gives the Atlantics the championship for the year by a 1512 score.

Professional matches 

At its December 1868 meeting the NABBP permitted professional clubs for the first time. There had been no professional clubs outside the Association, and no brand new professional clubs were established for 1869. Rather, the entire first-year effect of the change was that twelve existing members declared professional status. All of them had fielded at least regionally strong teams in 1868 and most if not all had compensated at least some of their players. (Some compensation of players continued in the amateur field.)

The Cincinnati Red Stockings were first to sign an all-salary team, ten men for eight months. From the west, the strongest team in Cleveland also joined the pro field. From the eastern corridor there were ten including all of the one-time champions and claimants.

Cincinnati was unbeatable. Otherwise the record of professional matches (see table) is remarkable for its balance, relative to the records of the stronger teams during the amateur era and to most of the following pro seasons.

The Irvingtons did not travel, or win; after July they played only two matches with the Mutuals (four in all). Forest City of Cleveland did not travel far, only to Cincinnati and upstate New York. Those two did not face each other or any of the three teams standing just above them. That imbalance, typical of the time, contributed to the losing records of all five. Weaker teams were weaker gate attractions with less incentive and almost always less ability to travel.

The Irvingtons disbanded and the Keystones returned to amateur ranks, but all the others remained in the professional field for 1870. Indeed, all but Cincinnati remained in operation at least to 1872.

Amateur clubs 

The amateur ranks during 1869 probably included some clubs who compensated their players by traditional methods such as division of the gate receipts (as Spalding said of Rockford by the end of the decade). Four of the amateurs would "go pro" in 1870, including the Forest City of Rockford, Illinois, with some success.

The professional field was relatively strong in 1869 and its weaker teams did not play many games. The Forest Citys did not beat any pro teams, but they played only four matches with Cincinnati, losing three by twenty runs and one by merely 14–15 on July 24. (They traveled no further than Detroit and Ohio while eastern pros also traveled no further than Ohio, home of their westernmost rivals. Even so, the Forest Citys of Rockford and Cleveland did not get together.)

The Stars of Brooklyn, led by pitcher Candy Cummings, won 2 of 7 matches with pro teams, beating the Mutuals 26–12 on June 19 and the visiting Olympics of Washington 49–11 on July 19. They lost five to the Mutuals and Atlantics by only 28 runs, total margin. Harvard college won 1 of 6 against pros, beating the powerful Athletics of Philadelphia 35–21 on July 9; the next day they lost a close one to the much weaker Keystones. Against amateurs Star won fourteen with one defeat; Harvard won thirteen with one draw. Next season they would win six each against the slightly larger pro field.

Lowell of Boston, listed among the major teams by Bill Ryczek, played three fairly close game against the pros, losing 21–26 to the Mutuals, 9–29 to undefeated Red Stockings, and 33–38 to the Eckfords.

Pastime of Baltimore won 2 of 9 against pro teams, including 1 of 4 local matches Maryland and one with the Troy Haymakers. The Olympics, Mutuals, Athletics, and Keystones beat them four teams by only 32 runs, total margin. Resolute of Elizabeth, New Jersey beat Irvington 16–15 and lost twice to the Eckfords.

Their records against pro teams:

These six amateur teams barely faced each other on the field: Lowell lost six to its local rival Harvard and one to Star (July 5, the Fourth being a Sunday that year). Harvard toured for ten days but played only the professional Eckfords in New York City.

Births

January
January [?] – Pat Luby
January [?] – Doc Potts
January 1 – Frank Connaughton
January 1 – Kid Keenan
January 4 – Tommy Corcoran
January 12 – Nat Hudson
January 13 – Jud Smith
January 28 – Ducky Holmes

February
February 6 – George Darby
February 14 – Ace Stewart
February 15 – Bill Fagan
February 15 – Charlie Irwin

March
March 6 – Hal Mauck
March 8 – Jim Hughey
March 9 – John McPherson
March 9 – Frank Quinlan
March 10 – Frank Bird
March 11 – Harry Colliflower
March 14 – Billy Rhines
March 17 – George Hogreiver
March 22 – Ed Fuller
March 22 – George Bausewine
March 24 – Al Lawson
March 26 – Jack McCarthy
March 27 – Toby Lyons
March 27 – Bill Wynne

April
April 2 – Hughie Jennings
April 17 – John Grimes
April 18 – George Borchers
April 20 – Tommy Dowd
April 20 – Sam Nicholl
April 26 – Fritz Clausen

May
May 8 – Tom Bannon
May 22 – John Thornton
May 23 – Algie McBride
May 29 – Marty Honan
May 30 – Tony Von Fricken

June
June 1 – Ted Breitenstein
June 1 – Bill Eagan
June 1 – Les German
June 2 – Tom Leahy
June 5 – George Ulrich
June 15 – Tom Hart
June 24 – Kirtley Baker
June 24 – John Weyhing

July
July [?] – Phil Wisner
July 2 – Walter Plock
July 3 – George Cuppy
July 10 – John Heydler

August
August 4 – Mike Gaule
August 13 – Jack Sharrott
August 15 – Tom Morrison
August 20 – Frank Bonner
August 20 – Robert Gibson
August 25 – Jack McFetridge
August 31 – Monte Cross

September
September 5 – Ed Stein
September 11 – Frank Kitson
September 14 – Kid Nichols
September 21 – Jim Garry
September 22 – Dummy Stephenson
September 30 – Hal O'Hagan

October
October 1 – Frank Motz
October 1 – Huyler Westervelt
October 2 – Scott Stratton
October 7 – Frank Donnelly
October 10 – Bill Moran
October 11 – Alex McFarlan
October 11 – Yale Murphy
October 12 – Ed Householder
October 12 – Malachi Kittridge
October 15 – Jack McMahon
October 18 – Frank Todd
October 20 – William Stecher
October 25 – Marty Hogan
October 25 – Jack Doyle
October 26 – John Gilroy
October 27 – Chick Pedroes

November
November [?] – Harry Morelock
November 2 – George Sharrott
November 4 – Mike Kilroy
November 8 – Joe Peitz
November 11 – Bert Abbey
November 18 – Lou Johnson
November 20 – Clark Griffith
November 21 – Alex Beam
November 21 – Billy Clingman

December
December [?] – Dick Butler
December 2 – Tom Stouch
December 8 – Kid Camp
December 20 – Bill McCauley
December 21 – Joe Harrington
December 23 – Mike Grady
December 23 – Mike Roach
December 24 – Zeke Wilson
December 25 – Alex Jones

Date of birth missing 
Frank McGinn
Bill Quarles
Joe Wright

References

Ryczek, William J. (1998). When Johnny Came Sliding Home: The Post-Civil War Baseball Boom, 1865-1870. Jefferson, NC: McFarland & Co. .
Wright, Marshall D. (2000). The National Association of Base Ball Players, 1857-1870. Jefferson, NC: McFarland & Co. .